William Horace Marshall (August 19, 1924 – June 11, 2003) was an American actor, director and opera singer. He played the title role in the 1972 blaxploitation classic Blacula and its sequel Scream Blacula Scream (1973), and appeared as the King of Cartoons on the 1980s television show Pee-wee's Playhouse and as Dr. Richard Daystrom on the Star Trek television series. He was 6‘5” (1.96 m) tall and was known for his bass voice.

Biography

Early life 

Marshall was born in Gary, Indiana, to Vereen Marshall, a dentist, and Thelma (née Edwards).

He attended New York University as an art student but transferred to the Actors Studio to study theater. He studied at the American Theatre Wing and with Sanford Meisner at the Neighborhood Playhouse.

Career 
Marshall made his Broadway debut in 1944 in Carmen Jones. In 1950, he understudied Boris Karloff as Captain Hook in the Broadway production of Peter Pan. He played the leading role of De Lawd in the 1951 revival of The Green Pastures, a role he repeated in 1958 in a BBC telecast of the play. He performed in several Shakespearean plays on the stage in the U. S. and Europe, including the title role in at least six productions of Othello. Harold Hobson of the London Sunday Times praised Marshall’s portrayal as "the best Othello of our time."

In 1968, Marshall joined the Center Theatre Group at the Ahmanson Theatre in Los Angeles to play Othello in a jazz musical version, Catch My Soul, with Jerry Lee Lewis as Iago.

Marshall portrayed Paul Robeson and Frederick Douglass on stage. He researched Douglass's life extensively, and in 1983 produced and played the lead role in Frederick Douglass: Slave and Statesman.

Film and television career 
Marshall's career on screen began in the 1952 film Lydia Bailey as a Haitian leader. He followed that with a prominent role as Glycon, comrade and fellow gladiator to Victor Mature in the 1954 film Demetrius and the Gladiators. His demeanor, voice and stature gave him a wide range, though he was ill-suited for the subservient roles that many black actors of his generation were most frequently offered.  He was a leader of the Mau-Mau uprising in Something of Value (1957), and Attorney General Edward Brooke in The Boston Strangler (1968). He probably received the most notice for his role in the vampire film Blacula and its sequel Scream Blacula Scream.  
 
In the early 1950s, Marshall starred briefly in Harlem Detective, a series about black police officers. The show was canceled when Marshall was named as a communist in the anti-communist newsletter Counterattack.

Despite blacklisting because of his supposed communist connections, Marshall continued to appear in both television and films. He appeared on the British spy series Danger Man in episodes titled "Deadline" (1962) and "The Galloping Major" (1964). Marshall played the role of traveling opera singer Thomas Bowers on the 1964 Bonanza episode "Enter Thomas Bowers," and that same year he appeared, with actor Ivan Dixon, as the leader of a newly independent African nation and as a T.H.R.U.S.H. agent in the first-season episode of The Man from U.N.C.L.E. entitled "The Vulcan Affair", also on the 1964 Rawhide episode "Incident at Seven Fingers" where he played a Buffalo Soldier.  In 1968 he appeared as Dr. Richard Daystrom in the Star Trek episode "The Ultimate Computer". In 1969, he had a special guest appearance as the character Amalek in an episode of The Wild Wild West entitled "The Night of the Egyptian Queen". He reprised his Othello persona in 1979 on Steve Allen's "Meeting of the Minds".

He won two local Emmys for producing and performing in a PBS production, As Adam Early in the Morning, a theatre piece originally performed on stage. He also was featured in an episode of The Alfred Hitchcock Hour titled, "The Jar", with actors Pat Buttram and George Lindsey.

Marshall played the King of Cartoons on Pee-wee's Playhouse, replacing actor Gilbert Lewis, during the 1980s.

In 1985, guest starred on Benson as Mr. Reaper (death) season 7 episode 4 "The Stranger"

Later life and death 
In addition to acting and producing, Marshall taught acting at various universities including the University of California, Irvine, and the Mufandi Institute, an African-American arts and music institution in the Watts section of Los Angeles. He did similar work at Chicago's ETA Creative Arts Foundation, which in 1992 named Marshall one of its Epic Men of the 20th century.

For 42 years, Marshall was the partner of Sylvia Gussin Jarrico, former wife of blacklisted screenwriter Paul Jarrico. Marshall died June 11, 2003, from complications arising from Alzheimer's disease and diabetes. He was survived by sons Tariq, Malcolm, and Claude Marshall and daughter Gina Loring. Eulogists at his funeral included Sidney Poitier, Ivan Dixon, Paul Winfield, and Marla Gibbs.

Awards 
 Emmy Award for Best Lead Actor in a Drama Series, As Adam Early in the Morning (1974).

Filmography 

Lydia Bailey (1952) – King Dick
Demetrius and the Gladiators (1954) – Glycon
Something of Value (1957) – Leader – Intellectual in Suit
Sabu and the Magic Ring (1957) – Ubal, the genie
La fille de feu (1958) – Stork
The Big Pride (1961) – Sutlej 
Piedra de toque (1963) – African Missionary (uncredited)
To Trap a Spy (1964) – Sekue Ashumen
The Hell with Heroes (1968) – Al Poland
The Boston Strangler (1968) – Atty. Gen. Edward W. Brooke
Skullduggery (1970) – Attorney General
The Mask of Sheba (1970) – Captain Condor Sekallie
Zig Zag (1970) – Morris Bronson
Honky (1971) – Dr. Craig Smith
Blacula (1972) – Blacula / Mamuwalde
Scream Blacula Scream (1973) – Blacula / Mamuwalde
Abby (1974) – Bishop Garnet Williams
Twilight's Last Gleaming (1977) – William Klinger – Attorney General
The Great Skycopter Rescue (1980) – Mr. Jason
 The Tragedy of Othello (1981) – Othello
Vasectomy: A Delicate Matter (1986) – Dr. Dean
Amazon Women on the Moon (1987) – Pirate Captain (segment "Video Pirates")
Maverick (1994) – Riverboat Poker Player #10
Sorceress (1995) – John Geiger
Dinosaur Valley Girls (1996) – Dr. Benjamin Michaels

References

External links 

 
 
 
 In Loving Memory Of William-Marshall

  Via CBS News.

1924 births
2003 deaths
20th-century American male actors
20th-century African-American male singers
20th-century American male opera singers
African-American male opera singers
African-American male actors
American male film actors
American male stage actors
American male television actors
Deaths from Alzheimer's disease
Deaths from dementia in California
Deaths from diabetes
Male actors from Indiana
Actors from Gary, Indiana
University of California, Irvine faculty
New York University alumni
Singers from Indiana
Classical musicians from Indiana